Moira Gatens  is an Australian academic feminist philosopher and current Challis Professor of Philosophy at the University of Sydney. She previously held the Spinoza Chair at the University of Amsterdam, Netherlands.

Biography

Academic career
Gatens served as president of the Australasian Association of Philosophy in 2011. She was appointed in her current position as Challis Professor of Philosophy in 2012.

Gatens was elected Fellow of the Academy of the Social Sciences in Australia in 1999 and of the Australian Academy of the Humanities in 2010.

Select publications
Feminism and Philosophy: Perspectives on Difference and Equality United Kingdom, Polity Press, 1991 
Imaginary Bodies: Ethics, Power and Corporeality. United Kingdom: Routledge, 1996. 
Feminist Interpretations of Benedict Spinoza. United States: Pennsylvania State University Press, 2009. 
Spinoza's Hard Path to Freedom. Assen, Netherlands, Royal Van Gorcum, 2011.

References

External links
Moira Gatens at University of Sydney

Further reading
 
Feminist Legal Studies: Revisiting the Continental Shelf: Moira Gatens on Law, Religion, and Human Rights in Eliot, Feuerbach, and Spinoza. 
Laurie, Timothy (2019), 'Thinking Without Monsters: The Role of Philosophy in Moira Gatens' 
Richardson-Self, Louise (2019), 'Reflections on Imagination and Embodiment in the Work of Moira Gatens, 1983-2008' 

Living people
Fellows of the Academy of the Social Sciences in Australia
University of New South Wales alumni
Academic staff of the Australian National University
Fellows of the Australian Academy of the Humanities
Academic staff of the University of Sydney
Australian women philosophers
20th-century Australian philosophers
21st-century Australian philosophers
Postmodern feminists
Feminist philosophers
Political philosophers
Spinoza scholars
1954 births